Blackpill railway station served the suburb of Blackpill, in the historical county of Glamorgan, Wales, from 1807 to 1960 on the Swansea and Mumbles Railway.

History
The station was opened on 25 March 1807 by the Oystermouth Railway. Like the rest of the stations on the line, the first services were horse-drawn. It closed in 1827 but it reopened on 25 July 1860. It was known as Blackpill Road and Bishopston Road in some timetables and Blackpill or Bishopston Road in the 22 January 1875 edition of Cambrian Railways. It was resited on 26 August 1900. The station closed along with the line on 6 January 1960.

References

Disused railway stations in Swansea
Railway stations in Great Britain opened in 1860
Railway stations in Great Britain closed in 1960
1960 disestablishments in Wales